Deaf to the City is a 1987 Canadian drama film, written and directed by Mireille Dansereau and based on the novel with the same name by Marie-Claire Blais. The film stars Angèle Coutu as Florence, a woman who moves into a seedy hotel in downtown Montreal after her husband leaves her, befriending the hotel's owner Gloria (Béatrice Picard) and her deaf son Mike (Guillaume Lemay-Thivierge).

The film was entered into the main competition at the 44th edition of the Venice Film Festival.

In his 2003 book A Century of Canadian Cinema, Gerald Pratley referred to it as "a bleak story to read, and an even bleaker film to watch".

Cast

References

External links

1987 films
1987 drama films
Films directed by Mireille Dansereau
Canadian drama films
Films based on Canadian novels
French-language Canadian films
1980s Canadian films